Rescue, formerly Green Valley, El Dorado County, California, is an unincorporated community in El Dorado County, California. It is located north-northwest of Shingle Springs and north-northeast of Cameron Park.  The zip code is 95672, and Rescue is located in area code 530. The town lies at an elevation of 1214 feet (370 m).

Locale
Rescue consists of primarily farmland, vineyards are a part of the Sierra Foothills AVA and ranches with an expanding amount of residential neighborhoods and businesses. Neighborhoods vary from tightly knit semi-suburban areas to more rural, spread out neighborhoods. Downtown Rescue is quite small, with only a post office, Fire Station, two churches, and a Community Center to distinguish it from the more rural areas. A restaurant operated in the former quarters of a longtime business known as Rescue Store which also sold gasoline, but has been closed for a few years.

History
The town of Rescue was established in 1895. The story goes that Andrew Hare was "rescued" from poverty by his mining, and named the town Rescue. The town was once a stop on the Pony Express trail between Placerville and Folsom.

Education
Rescue is served by the Rescue Union School District at the primary and middle school level. At the high school level, it is served by the El Dorado Union High School District, mainly at the Ponderosa High School campus.

Geography
Pine Hill Ecological Reserve is located in Rescue. The Reserve is one unit of the much larger Pine Hill Preserve  system that consists of five separate units of varying size that total more than 4,000 acres (16 km2) and protects eight rare plants and their gabbro soil habitat.

References

External links

Unincorporated communities in California
Unincorporated communities in El Dorado County, California
Populated places established in 1895
1895 establishments in California